Billy Earl McClelland (September 19, 1950 – October 3, 2013) was an American session guitarist and songwriter.

Overview
Born in Cusseta, Alabama, United States, McClelland left high school to go to Nashville, Tennessee, and was signed by a record label. As a session guitarist in Nashville, he worked with B.J. Thomas, Willie Nelson, Tony Joe White, Hank Snow, Townes Van Zandt, Brenda Lee, and Mel Tillis. He wrote songs for Hank Williams Jr., Waylon Jennings, Jerry Jeff Walker, T.G. Sheppard, Sawyer Brown and Delbert McClinton.

Eventually, he released a rock-oriented record on Elektra. A second album, 'Ready or Not', remains unreleased by the label.

Later, McClelland moved to Memphis, Tennessee at the urging of Skip McQuinn. While there, his passion for the blues led him to produce the first Big Bill Morganfield recording, engineered by Mike Durff and Tyler Bell.

McClelland continued to be a regular in clubs and festivals throughout the Southeast. McClelland also worked with Bo Diddley and Albert Collins.  His album Judgment Day (2000) received critical acclaim from all of the major blues magazines.

McClelland helmed Mojo:Saint, a contemporary blues project, along with veteran drummer David Brazeal and bassist Jack Hall [Wet Willie].

He was inducted into the Alabama Music Hall of Fame.

McClelland died on October 3, 2013, from complications after a heart attack at the East Alabama Medical Center in Opelika, Alabama.  He was aged 63.

Discography
Billy Burnette, Polydor Records, 1979, As a member of Billy Burnette's group
Zero Hindsight, Elektra Asylum Records, 1980
'Ready or Not', Elektra Asylum Records, unreleased - 1980
Murdered By Love, 1986, as a member of the band Blue Monday
For the Fathers of Rock and Roll, Personal Records, 1986
Nineteen Years Old: A Tribute to Muddy Waters, Taxim, 1999, producer and member of Big Bill Morganfield's band
Judgment Day, MojoBlues Records, 2000
Now And Then, Then And Now, Chips Moman Records, 2001, as a member of Billy Joe Royal's band
Even More Good Whiskey Blues, Taxim, compilation, 2005
Blues From the Heart of Dixie, Taxim, compilation, 2006
Floral Park Bootleg, Jammates Records, 2006

References

1950 births
2013 deaths
American blues guitarists
American male guitarists
American rock guitarists
American session musicians
20th-century American guitarists
20th-century American male musicians